The fastest times in the swimming events at the Asian Games are designated as the Asian Games records in swimming. The events are held in a long course (50 m) pool. The last Games were held in Jakarta, Indonesia in 2018.

All records were set in finals unless noted otherwise.

Men

Women

Mixed relay

References

Asian Games
Records
Swimming